Shōdoshima or  is an island located in the Inland Sea of Japan. The name means "Island of Small Beans". There are two towns on the island: Tonoshō and Shōdoshima, composing the district of Shōzu.

The island is famous as the setting for the novel Twenty-Four Eyes and its subsequent film adaptations. The island was the first area of Japan to successfully grow olives, and it is sometimes known as "Olive Island".

Geography 

Shōdoshima is part of Kagawa Prefecture and is located north of the prefectural capital Takamatsu. It is the 23rd largest island in Japan, and the second largest in the Seto Inland Sea.

Shōdoshima is home to Dofuchi Strait, the world's narrowest strait,  meters at its narrowest.

Frequent ferries run to the island from Takamatsu, Himeji, Teshima and Okayama. Ferries run infrequently to Osaka and Kōbe as well.

History 

Shōdoshima was once known as Azuki-shima and was part of Kibi (later Bizen) Province, given to Sanuki Province, and finally made part of Kagawa prefecture.

Tourism and culture 

Shōdoshima is a popular destination for domestic tourism in Japan. The island is the birthplace of two other distinguished writers: Sakae's husband the poet Shigeji Tsuboi and the novelist and short-story writer Denji Kuroshima. All three were prominent participants in the proletarian literary movement, an important and politically radical current within modern Japanese literature.

Shōdoshima is also known for its olives, soy sauce, wild monkeys, and beaches. In addition, tourists are attracted to a miniature version of the 88-temple Shikoku Pilgrimage.

The island is also famous for being the first in Japan to successfully cultivate olives. Olive trees proliferate on the island and olive-related merchandise is quite popular with tourists. Milos, Greece, is Shōdoshima's sister island.

The island is the setting for the manga and anime series Teasing Master Takagi-san. Native creator Sōichirō Yamamoto was raised in Tonoshō Town.

The island's mascot is Olive Shima-chan, who is an olive-shaped prince those task is to find secret spots of the island and to test taste olive oil for quality. He likes white rice. His birthday is on August 15. He is assisted by Mimozanoriku-chan and Rukkarukka.
Olive King has protected the island for 100 years, he is Olive Shima-chan's master. 15 March is his birthday. 
Mimozanoriku-chan is a mimosa. She is the girlfriend of Olive Shima-chan and is responsible to signalling the island's residents about the arrival of spring. Her birthday is March 8. 
Rukkarukka, on the hand, an olive who is a crybaby. His birthday is November 16.

Sister island 
 Milos, Greece (1989)

See also 
 Kankakei
 Kankakei Ropeway
 Olive Jinja

Notes

External links 

 Japan National Tourist Organization
 Shodoshima Tourism Association 
 A local tour guide's blog "Living in Shodoshima" 
 Crossing times to Angel Road

Islands of Kagawa Prefecture
Islands of the Seto Inland Sea